Sagardighi is about  from Ghatail Upazila headquarters in Tangail District of Bangladesh. There is a place called Sagardighi earlier, it is a Union in Ghatail upazila. There is a famous lake on the land of 12.80 acres. The ditch was excavated by the local Pala dynasty sagar king.

Location

About  from Ghatail upazila of Tangail district of Bangladesh. Previously located at Sagardighi.

History

The ditch was excavated by the local Pala dynasty sagar king. The ruins of Shan paved ghatala are still found in the west side of this dighi, which is believed to be the residence of the king of the sea. The former name was Lohani. From Sagardighi, there is a huge lake in the south, which has a size of 25 acres of land. Banraj Pal, son of the Sea of Sagar, dug it.

Populated places in Tangail District